The 1946 Fordham Rams football team represented Fordham University as an independent during the 1946 college football season. Led by first-year head coach Ed Danowski, Fordham compiled a record of 0–7.

Schedule

References

Fordham
Fordham Rams football seasons
College football winless seasons
Fordham Rams football